Nantong Xingdong International Airport  is an airport serving the city of Nantong in Jiangsu Province. Construction started in 1990 and flights commenced in 1993. In 2016 the airport handled 1,538,158 passengers and 35,371.1 tons of cargo.

Facilities

Airlines and destinations

Passenger

See also
List of airports in the People's Republic of China

References

External links
Official web site

Airports in Jiangsu
Nantong
Airports established in 1993
1993 establishments in China